The Greatest Showman is a 2017 American biographical musical drama film directed by Michael Gracey in his directorial debut, written by Jenny Bicks and Bill Condon and starring Hugh Jackman, Zac Efron, Michelle Williams, Rebecca Ferguson, and Zendaya. Featuring nine original songs from Benj Pasek and Justin Paul, the film is based on the story and life of P.T. Barnum, a famous showman and entertainer, and his creation of the Barnum & Bailey Circus and the lives of its star attractions.

Principal photography began in New York City in November 2016. The film premiered on December 8, 2017, aboard RMS Queen Mary 2. It was released in the United States on December 20, 2017, by 20th Century Fox, seven months after Ringling Bros. and Barnum & Bailey Circus ceased operations. The film grossed $435million worldwide, making it the fifth-highest-grossing live-action musical film of all time.

The film was praised for the performances, music, visuals, and production values, but was criticised for its artistic license. It received nominations for Best Motion Picture – Musical or Comedy and Best Actor – Musical or Comedy for Jackman at the 75th Golden Globe Awards. The film won the Golden Globe Award for Best Original Song for the song "This Is Me", was nominated for Best Original Song at the 90th Academy Awards and won the Best Compilation Soundtrack for Visual Media at the 61st Annual Grammy Awards.

Plot

As a child, P. T. Barnum and his tailor father Philo work for the Hallett family. Barnum falls for the Halletts’ daughter, Charity. When Charity attends finishing school, she and Barnum write to each other until reuniting as adults. They eventually marry and raise two daughters Caroline and Helen in New York City. They live a humble life and though Charity is happy, Barnum craves more.

Barnum loses his shipping clerk job when the company goes bankrupt, due to a typhoon that sank all the firm's cargo vessels. He later secures a bank loan, deceptively using his former employer's lost ships as "collateral". He opens Barnum's American Museum in downtown Manhattan which features various wax figures. Ticket sales are slow, so Caroline and Helen suggest showcasing something "alive". Barnum adds "freak" performers, such as bearded lady Lettie Lutz and dwarf man Charles Stratton. This garners higher attendance, but also protests and poor reviews from well-known critic James Gordon Bennett.

Barnum renames his venture, "Barnum's Circus" and recruits playwright Phillip Carlyle to help generate publicity. Phillip is mesmerized by the African American trapeze artist, Anne Wheeler, but he hides his feelings. Phillip arranges for Barnum and his troupe to meet Queen Victoria. Barnum persuades famed Swedish singer Jenny Lind to tour America, with him as her manager. Lind's American debut is a success. During her song, Phillip's parents see him and Anne holding hands. As Barnum gains favor with aristocratic patrons, he distances himself from his troupe, advising them to work without him. Dejected, they decide to stand against their local harassers.

When Phillip and Anne attend the theater together, they run into Phillip's parents. They chastise him for "parading around with the help". Phillip tries to convince Anne that they can be together, but she disagrees saying they will never be accepted socially. As Barnum takes Lind on a U.S. tour, Charity, who stays home with the girls, feels isolated from her husband. While on tour, Lind becomes romantically attracted to Barnum. When he rebuffs her, she threatens to quit and later retaliates with a surprise kiss at the end of her last show, which is photographed by the press.

Barnum returns home to find his circus on fire, caused by a fight between protesters and the troupe. Phillip runs into the burning building to save Anne, not knowing that she has already escaped. He suffers serious injuries before Barnum rescues him. Bennett tells Barnum that the culprits have been caught and that Lind has cancelled her tour after Barnum's "scandal". Barnum's mansion is foreclosed and Charity having found out about the kiss berates Barnum for being in love with only himself and his show and takes the girls to her parents' home.

Devastated, Barnum retreats to a local bar. His troupe finds him there and say that despite their disappointments, they still consider themselves a family. Inspired, he resolves to build a new show and not let ambition rule him. Phillip awakens in a hospital with Anne by his side, while Barnum and Charity reconcile.

A recovering Phillip offers his share of the profits to help Barnum rebuild the circus in exchange for becoming a full partner, which Barnum readily accepts. To economize, Barnum transforms the enterprise into an open-air tent circus.

The revamped circus is a huge success and Barnum has Phillip take his place as the ringmaster so the former can spend more time with his family. Barnum leaves the circus early and arrives on an elephant to attend Caroline and Helen's ballet recital.

The movie ends with a quote from P.T. Barnum that reads "The noblest art is that of making others happy".

Cast

Production
During rehearsals for the 81st Academy Awards in 2009, producers Laurence Mark and Bill Condon compared host Jackman to Barnum. After Jackman expressed interest in a Barnum project, Mark and Condon approached Jenny Bicks, a writer for the ceremony. She and Condon wrote The Greatest Showman. The project was first announced in 2009, with Jackman already set for the title role. In August 2011, Michael Gracey was chosen to direct. In 2013, Fox hired lyricists Pasek and Paul to write the songs.

In early 2016, the cast performed a read-through in front of producers to green-light the film. Pasek and Paul approached Jeremy Jordan to sing the part of Carlyle, since Jordan recorded demos for the film in 2015. The day before the read-through, Jackman underwent nasal surgery and was ordered by his doctor not to sing. Pasek and Paul asked Jordan to also sing the part of Barnum while Jackman acted out the scenes, to which Jordan agreed. While the cast performed "From Now On", Jackman disobeyed orders and began singing along with Jordan. This brought the read-through to an emotional end, which resulted in the film being greenlit.

On June 15, 2016, Zac Efron began negotiations to star in the film, and in July 2016, Michelle Williams was cast. The film was choreographed by Ashley Wallen.

Filming
The film took seven years to produce, and Jackman had ten weeks of preparation before filming started. Rehearsals on the film began in October 2016 in New York City, and principal photography began on November 22, 2016.

Post-production
In December 2017, it was reported that James Mangold, who had worked with Jackman on several projects (including 2017's Logan), had been brought in to serve as an executive producer during the film's post-production. In an interview, director Michael Gracey noted, "There were eight producers on this film, and it was amazing having one of them be a filmmaker."

Music

Musical numbers

Soundtrack

The soundtrack album is produced by Justin Paul, Benj Pasek, Greg Wells, Kevin Weaver and Pete Ganbarg, featuring the eleven tracks performed by the cast. In the United Kingdom, on March 23, 2018, it became only the second album in 30 years to achieve 11 consecutive weeks at number 1, equalling the record set by Adele's 21. , the album has spent the sixth most time at number one at 28 non-consecutive weeks, matching the Beatles' Sgt. Pepper's Lonely Hearts Club Band.

The Greatest Showman: Reimagined

On November 16, 2018, a remix album was also released, The Greatest Showman: Reimagined, which features covers of songs from the soundtrack by musicians including James Arthur, Anne-Marie, Sara Bareilles, Kelly Clarkson, Kesha, Pink, Panic! At the Disco, Years & Years, Jess Glynne, Ty Dolla $ign, Missy Elliott and Zac Brown Band among others.

Release

The Greatest Showman held its premiere on December 8, 2017, aboard RMS Queen Mary 2, while it was docked in New York City. The film was then released in the United States on December 20, 2017.

As with Disney's live-action Beauty and the Beast, a sing-along version of the film was released in the United Kingdom on February 23, 2018. The film had a limited IMAX release on 2 February 2018.

Marketing
On June 28, 2017, 20th Century Fox released the first international trailer to promote the film. On November 13, 2017, the second trailer was released.

On December 17, 2017, Fox televised a live performance of "Come Alive" from Warner Bros. Studios during its live musical special A Christmas Story Live! (which was based on fellow Pasek and Paul work A Christmas Story: The Musical). The number featured the film's stars and a cast of 150 dancers.

Home media
In the United States, the film was released via digital download on March 20, 2018, and was released on DVD, Blu-ray, and 4K Ultra HD on April 10, 2018.

In the United Kingdom, the film was released first on digital download on April 27, 2018, while DVD, Blu-ray, and 4K Ultra HD copies went on sale on May 14, 2018. These versions included the sing-along version, two hours of behind-the-scenes footage, and music machine jukebox features.

The Greatest Showman was released on the US & Canada version of Disney's streaming service Disney+ on August 14, 2020, following Disney's acquisition of 20th Century Fox in 2019.

Reception

Box office
The Greatest Showman spent 219 days in release, closing on July 26, 2018, having grossed $174.3million in the United States and Canada, and $260.7million in other territories, for a worldwide total of $435million, against a production budget of $84million. It is the third-highest-grossing musical ever in North America and also the third-highest globally, and Deadline Hollywood estimated the film would turn a profit of $50–100 million.

In the United States and Canada, The Greatest Showman was released alongside Jumanji: Welcome to the Jungle, and was projected to gross around $21million from 3,006 theaters over its first six days. It took in $2.5million on its first day and $2.1million on its second. Over the three-day weekend, it grossed $9million (for a six-day total of $19million), finishing fourth at the box office, behind Star Wars: The Last Jedi, Jumanji: Welcome to the Jungle and Pitch Perfect 3. In its second weekend, the film grossed $15.5million, again finishing 4th at the box office. The weekend-to-weekend increase of 76.3% marked the largest ever for a film playing in over 3,000 theaters, and the fourth biggest ever. In its third week, the film dropped 11% to $14million. The film made $13million in its fourth weekend and $11million in its fifth, finishing 4th and 5th at the box office, respectively. The film continued to hold well in its sixth week of release, grossing $9.5million and returning to 4th place, and again finished fourth in its seventh week, this time grossing $7.8million (a drop of just 18%). It is the 14th-highest-grossing film that never reached first place at the American box office.

Critical response
On review aggregator Rotten Tomatoes, 56% of 265 reviews are positive, and the average rating is 6/10. The website's critical consensus reads, "The Greatest Showman tries hard to dazzle the audience with a Barnum-style sense of wonder—but at the expense of its complex subject's far more intriguing real-life story." On Metacritic, the film has a weighted average score of 48 out of 100, based on reviews from 43 critics, indicating "mixed or average reviews". Audiences polled by CinemaScore gave the film an average grade of "A" on an A+ to F scale, while those at PostTrak gave it 4.5 out of 5 stars and a 70% "definite recommend".

Owen Gleiberman of Variety gave the film a positive review, writing, "The Greatest Showman is a concoction, the kind of film where all the pieces click into place, yet at an hour and 45 minutes it flies by, and the link it draws between P.T. Barnum and the spirit of today is more than hype." Richard Roeper of the Chicago Sun-Times gave the film 3 out of 4 stars, saying, "With all that corn and cheese and old-timey sentiment, The Greatest Showman ends up scoring some very timely social arguments. P.T. Barnum himself would have approved the dramatic sleight of hand." Steve Persall of Tampa Bay Times gave the film an 'A', and said, "The Greatest Showman is the feel-good movie the holiday season needs," while William Bibbiani of IGN gave The Greatest Showman a score of 7.9 out of 10, and called the film, "wildly entertaining".

Britton Peele of The Dallas Morning News said, "The story is interesting and the beats are well acted, but it's the musical numbers that make The Greatest Showman." Jackie K Cooper of HuffPost gave the film a score of 10/10 and wrote, "You will be overwhelmed by the music and magic that explode on the screen. The film has a message that should resonate with today's world concerning acceptance and courage." Hugh Armitage of Digital Spy said, "The Greatest Showman is a broad and solid crowd-pleaser. An undemanding spectacle for all the family." Alan Jones of the Radio Times called it "A joyously uplifting potpourri of visual resplendence, stylish choreography and solid gold magic, one engineered to approximate the lavish spectacle the movie musical once offered."

Sheila O'Malley of RogerEbert.com gave it 3.5 out of 4, stating "The Greatest Showman is an unabashed piece of pure entertainment punctuated by memorable songs." James Berardinelli of ReelViews gave the film 3 out of 4, and said, "The film has show-stopping well-choreographed numbers with catchy tunes," and Calvin Wilson of the St. Louis Post-Dispatch called the film "highly enjoyable."

Carl Kozlowski of Pasadena Weekly gave the film an 'A', calling it "Groundbreaking & grandly innovative." Sean P. Means of The Salt Lake Tribune gave The Greatest Showman 3.5 out of 4, stating, "A strong cast give emotional power to this romanticized, tune-filled biography." Manuela Lazic of Little White Lies gave it 4 out of 5, saying, "The Greatest Showman deserves to become a Christmas classic. The film's severe romanticism and ridiculous but affecting enthusiasm make it irresistibly life-affirming." Pete Hammond of Deadline Hollywood gave the film 4 out of 5 stars and called it, "A fantasia of song and dance, a joyous exercise in pure entertainment that is made for the holiday crowd."

Conversely, Mick LaSalle of the San Francisco Chronicle gave the film a negative review, criticizing the songs and characters and saying "There's idiotic, and there's magnificent, but The Greatest Showman is that special thing that happens sometimes. It's magnificently idiotic. It's an awful mess, but it's flashy. The temptation is to cover your face and watch it through your fingers, because it's so earnest and embarrassing and misguided—and yet it's well made." In a negative review for The Hollywood Reporter, David Rooney wrote "This ersatz portrait of American big-top tent impresario P.T. Barnum is all smoke and mirrors, no substance. It hammers pedestrian themes of family, friendship and inclusivity while neglecting the fundaments of character and story."

Writing for Rolling Stone, Peter Travers gave the film 1.5 out of 4 stars, saying, "How do you cast a virtuoso Hugh Jackman as P.T. Barnum, spare no expense in production values, add a score by Oscar and Tony winners Benj Pasek and Justin Paul and still end up with the shrill blast of nothing that is The Greatest Showman? Ask first-time director Michael Gracey, who cut his teeth on commercials and music videos without ever mastering the crucial knack of building snippets of musical comedy and drama into a satisfying whole." Justin Chang of the Los Angeles Times wrote that the film's failures "are rooted in something deeper: a dispiriting lack of faith in the audience's intelligence, and a dawning awareness of its own aesthetic hypocrisy. You've rarely seen a more straight-laced musical about the joys of letting your freak flag fly."

Rhoda Roberts, arts director of the Sydney Opera House, criticized the film for failing to address that Barnum coerced and kidnapped native peoples to perform in human zoos as a form of entertainment.

Historical inaccuracies
The Greatest Showman included many historical inaccuracies. Vanity Fair called it "a highly fictionalized musical biopic". The New Yorker said that "there's a sort of poetic injustice in the fact that 'The Greatest Showman,' the new musical... based on the life of P. T. Barnum, the long-famed 'Prince of Humbug,' should be largely fabricated out of synthetic cloth". The Smithsonian magazine wrote that "P.T. Barnum isn't the hero the 'Greatest Showman' wants you to think", highlighting that "his path to fame and notoriety began by exploiting an enslaved woman, in life and in death, as entertainment for the masses". The Smithsonian refers to Barnum's first theatrical foray in 1835, where he exhibited an African American slave woman named Joice Heth and claimed she was one hundred and sixty-one years old, while she was actually in her seventies. At the time it was illegal to own slaves in New York but Barnum got around this by "renting" Ms. Heth. Barnum also falsely claimed that she had raised George Washington. After Heth died in 1836, Barnum arranged a public autopsy, which he charged admission for. In her book Medical Apartheid: The Dark History of Medical Experimentation on Black Americans from Colonial Times to the Present, Harriet Washington included this as an example of the way African Americans were treated as subhuman in terms of medical procedures and testing. Another Barnum hoax was the Fiji Mermaid which in reality was the body of a monkey and the tail of a fish. Barnum's shows were also notorious for the cruelty inflicted on the animals, which resulted in the death of at least two whales.

In addition to leaving out many aspects of Barnum's career, the people and events depicted in the movie were heavily fictionalized. Two of the lead characters, Phillip Carlyle and Anne Wheeler, were completely fictional. The character of Jenny Lind is portrayed as a glamorous woman who becomes infatuated with Barnum and, when he doesn't respond to her overtures, quits the show. In her final performance, she lures Barnum out to the stage for a public kiss in an attempt to flame rumors about their romance. In reality, Lind dressed plainly and was known for her charitable donations both in her home country and to various charities in the US. Neither Lind nor Barnum displayed any romantic interest in each other. Lind found Barnum to be crude and Barnum was more interested in money than romance. Lind broke off her successful tour with Barnum early because she was unhappy with Barnum's marketing.

Accolades

Possible sequel
In September 2019, a sequel for the film was already in development, with Jackman confirmed to reprise his role. 
However, the sequel's future is now uncertain after Disney chose to end a distribution deal for Chernin Entertainment's films by 20th Century Fox in early 2020. In September 2022, Jackman stated that he was still interested in a sequel being produced if both companies could come to an agreement.

See also
 Barnum, a 1980 Broadway show with music by Cy Coleman
 The Greatest Show on Earth, a 1952 film directed by Cecil B. DeMille

Notes

References

External links

 
 
 
 
 
 The Greatest Showman at History vs. Hollywood

2017 films
2010s biographical drama films
2010s musical drama films
American biographical films
American musical drama films
20th Century Fox films
Biographical films about businesspeople
Biographical films about entertainers
Films about playwrights
Circus films
2010s English-language films
Films set in New York City
Films shot in New York City
Films scored by John Debney
Films scored by Joseph Trapanese
Films produced by Peter Chernin
Films produced by Laurence Mark
Films with screenplays by Bill Condon
Musicals by Pasek and Paul
Cultural depictions of P. T. Barnum
Cultural depictions of Jenny Lind
Cultural depictions of Queen Victoria on film
Musical films based on actual events
2017 directorial debut films
2017 drama films
Films about interracial romance
Chernin Entertainment films
TSG Entertainment films
2010s American films
Films about sideshow performers